Tazeh Kand (also Romanized as Tāzeh Kand; also known as Tazakend) is a village in Rudqat Rural District, Sufian District, Shabestar County, East Azerbaijan Province, Iran. At the 2006 census, its population was 101, in 25 families.

References 

Populated places in Shabestar County